Axis Records may refer to:
 A record label operated by Jeff Mills, which releases most of his work
 Former name of 4AD, a record label started in 1979 as Axis Records by Ivo Watts-Russell and Peter Kent
 A budget record label derived from EMI